Balsaminol A or cucurbita-5,24-diene-3β,7β,23(R),29-tetraol,  is a chemical compound with formula , found in the Balsam apple vine (Momordica balsamina).  It is a cucurbitane-type triterpenoid, related to cucurbitacin, isolated by C. Ramalhete and others in 2009.

Balsaminol A is an amorphous powder soluble in methanol and ethyl acetate but insoluble in n-hexane. It is cytotoxic at about 50 μM.

See also 
 Balsaminapentaol
 Balsaminol B
 Cucurbalsaminol A
 Cucurbalsaminol B
 Karavilagenin E

References 

Triterpenes
Tetrols